Gaiman is a town in the Chubut Province of Patagonia in Argentina.

The town was founded in 1874 by David D. Roberts and acquired municipal rights in 1885. The Central Chubut Railway arrived in 1908 connecting Gaiman to Trelew. The Gaiman Train Tunnel was built in 1914 when the railway extended to Las Plumas.

Many people in the region have maintained the use of Welsh alongside Spanish. The annual youth Eisteddfod, a Welsh cultural festival, is held every September. The  (Regional Historical Museum) in the former station house commemorates the history of the Welsh community in the region.

The town's name originates in an indigenous Tehuelche place-name meaning "rocky point." Just  to the south of Gaiman is the Bryn Gwyn Paleontological Park.

Gallery

External links 

 Project-Hiraeth – Documents the stories of the Welsh colony in Patagonia, Argentina through film, text and illustration.
  Municipality of Gaiman Official website

Populated places in Chubut Province
Populated places established in 1874
Welsh settlement in Patagonia
1874 establishments in Argentina
Cities in Argentina
Argentina